Discography of the Russian singer of Edita Piekha, which let out 13 studio albums, 8 compilations, 21 extended plays, 3 singles.

Albums

Studio albums

Extended plays

Compilation

Miscellaneous

Singles

References 

Discographies of Russian artists